Hadi Hamdoon (born 5 February 1992) is a Qatari handball player for Al Rayyan and the Qatari national team.

References

1992 births
Living people
Qatari male handball players
Asian Games medalists in handball
Handball players at the 2014 Asian Games
Asian Games gold medalists for Qatar
Medalists at the 2014 Asian Games